Below is a list of early colour TV shows produced in the UK between the late 1950s up to 1970 where by that point, the majority of programmes were being produced in colour. The list features titles of shows, TV companies, transmission dates, formats and their archival status; noting whether they are lost, partially or mostly missing or have episodes that exist in B&W. Also included are some programmes which had one off transmissions, where applicable.

Pre 1966

1966

1967

1968

1969

1970

References

Footnotes

External links
 Early Color Television, Early Television Museum
 'The First Colour Television' by Richard Cavendish, History Today, July 7, 2008.
 Early BBC Colour Tests, www.meldrum.co.uk
 Colour Television in Britain, by Iain Baird, Science + Media Museum, May 15, 2011
 How colour TV crossed an ocean before it arrived in UK homes, by Chris Smith, BT, July 16, 2018.
 1966 On This Day: BBC Tunes into Colour, March 3, 1966

Lists of British television series